Don Garcia is an American para-alpine skier. He represented the United States at the 1988 Winter Paralympics in alpine skiing.

He won the bronze medal in the Men's Slalom LW9 event at the 1988 Winter Paralympics.

He also competed at the Men's Downhill LW9 event and the Men's Giant Slalom LW9 but did not win a medal.

References

External links 
 

Living people
Year of birth missing (living people)
Place of birth missing (living people)
Paralympic alpine skiers of the United States
American male alpine skiers
Alpine skiers at the 1988 Winter Paralympics
Medalists at the 1988 Winter Paralympics
Paralympic bronze medalists for the United States
Paralympic medalists in alpine skiing